James Douglas Morrison AO, FAA, FRSE, FRACI (1924–2013) was a Scottish born Australian physical chemist. Born and educated in Glasgow (BSc 1945, PhD 1948), he moved to Australia in 1949 to work with the CSIRO. There he switched from X-Ray crystallography to mass spectrometry as a research topic. 
In 1967 he was appointed as the foundation chair of physical chemistry at La Trobe University, where he was a professor of chemistry until retiring in 1989.

He is known for his work in mass spectrometry and he is one of the inventors of the triple quadrupole mass spectrometer.

References

Australian chemists
Mass spectrometrists
Officers of the Order of Australia
Fellows of the Australian Academy of Science
1924 births
2013 deaths